Ron Briggs (22 September 1929 – 10 October 2003) was an Australian cricketer. He played fifteen first-class matches for New South Wales between 1952/53 and 1954/55.

See also
 List of New South Wales representative cricketers

References

External links
 

1929 births
2003 deaths
Australian cricketers
New South Wales cricketers
Cricketers from Sydney